Elections for West Yorkshire County Council were held in April 1973, which resulted in a Labour lead for the new Metropolitan Council.

One month later, in May 1973, Metropolitan District Council elections were held for Bradford, Leeds, Halifax, Huddersfield and Wakefield. The county council was abolished thirteen years later in 1986.

References

1973 English local elections
1973
state=expanded